Gheorghe Cefan (born 6 March 1947) is a Romanian middle-distance runner. He competed in the 3000 metres steeplechase at the 1972 Summer Olympics and the 1976 Summer Olympics.

References

1947 births
Living people
Athletes (track and field) at the 1972 Summer Olympics
Athletes (track and field) at the 1976 Summer Olympics
Romanian male middle-distance runners
Romanian male steeplechase runners
Olympic athletes of Romania
Place of birth missing (living people)